The Dutch Miniature or  is a Dutch breed of small or miniature horse.

History 

The stud-book for the Dutch Miniature was begun in 1993.

Characteristics 

References 

Horse breeds originating in the Netherlands